Goba is a small town in Mozambique.  It is located in the south.

Transport 

Goba is served by a railway station on the Goba railway, which connects with the city of Mlawula, on the border with Eswatini.

In popular culture 
The natural landscapes around Goba were a filming location for the 2006 film Blood Diamond.

See also 

 Railway stations in Mozambique

References 

Populated places in Mozambique